Sky Bandits may refer to:

Sky Bandits (1940 film), an American film directed by Ralph Staub
Sky Bandits (1986 film), a British film directed by Zoran Perisic

See also 
Sky pirate (disambiguation)